Crosswits was a British game show produced by Tyne Tees in association with Cove Productions and Action Time and filmed from their City Road studios in Newcastle upon Tyne. It was first shown on 3 September 1985 originally hosted by Barry Cryer for the first 2 series, then comedian Tom O'Connor took over from series 3 until the show ended on 23 December 1998. The show consisted of two members of the public competing against each other to solve simple crossword puzzles. A "celebrity" partner helped each member of the public. The announcers for the show were generally Tyne Tees continuity announcers such as Judi Lines, Jonathan Morrell and Bill Steel.

Gameplay
Teams consist of two players (one celebrity and one contestant), solving words in a crossword puzzle (by virtue of clues), with 6 words to solve, with a clue word, all of which are clues to a keyword which links the 6 answers. Each correct answer keeps control and earns one point per letter in the answer plus a chance to solve the keyword for 10 bonus points. On the first two series, which had been transmitted weekly, the teams played for pounds. Later in the run, teams always took turns whether they were right or wrong.

There were also special rounds in the game:

 Anagram round – the first letter of every answer in the crossword puzzle makes the keyword.
 Mystery round – finding a keyword after one clue without assistance from a clue word wins the contestant a small prize such as a cordless phone or a pocket TV.
 Song round – all clues were lyrics to a well-known song.

The team with the most points when time runs out, wins the game, and plays the same Crossfire round as the American version. The other player received a dictionary and thesaurus.

Crossfire round
The winning team was shown one last crossword puzzle, with 10 words none of which are clues to a master puzzle. The host reads rapid-fire clues to each of the 10 words. Each correct words brings the winning team extra closer to a holiday for the contestant, and if they can solve all ten clues in 60 seconds or less, they'll win the holiday, otherwise the winning player wins a gold pen and pencil set.

Transmissions

Regional transmissions information

1985
The first series aired on Tuesday afternoons at 3pm, apart from TVS who aired the series on Thursday afternoons at the same time.

Early 1987
The second series aired on Monday evenings at 6:30pm in the Tyne Tees region. The rest of the regions aired the series on Tuesday afternoons at 3pm.

Late 1987
The third series aired on Tuesday to Thursday afternoons at 2pm, apart from TVS who aired the series on Monday afternoons at 3pm, but did not air all the episodes, and Channel who aired the series on Monday, Wednesday, and Friday afternoons at 3pm.

1988–94
From the fourth series up until the tenth series, the show aired on Monday to Friday mornings at 9:25am, just after TV-am/GMTV had finished.

1996
The eleventh series aired on Monday to Friday afternoons but was not networked. Depending on the region, it aired at random times in certain areas. 
 Carlton, Central, Tyne Tees, Westcountry and Yorkshire had shown the series at 1:25pm.
 Ulster aired the episodes at 1:55pm.
 Grampian put the shows out at 2:50pm.
 Scottish aired the episodes at 2:20pm, but only four times a week.
 Border and Granada aired the episodes at 5:10pm most days.
 Anglia and Meridian aired the episodes on most days at 12:55pm. Anglia continued to broadcast more episodes, finishing on 24 January 1997.
 HTV aired over half the episodes at 2:25pm, but did not complete the run.

1998
The twelfth series aired on Tuesday to Thursday afternoons at 1:50pm for the first 33 episodes from 6 January to 19 March. The last 3 episodes aired from 21 to 23 December 1998.

External links
 
 Crosswits at BFI
 

1980s British game shows
1990s British game shows
1985 British television series debuts
1998 British television series endings
English-language television shows
ITV game shows
Television shows produced by Tyne Tees Television
Television series by ITV Studios